Gabriele Ferro is a Grand Prix motorcycle racer from Italy.

Career statistics

By season

Grand Prix motorcycle racing

Races by year
(key)

References

External links
 Profile on motogp.com

1988 births
Living people
Italian motorcycle racers
250cc World Championship riders
125cc World Championship riders
People from Biella
Sportspeople from the Province of Biella